Blatta is a genus of cockroaches. The name Blatta represents a specialised use of Latin blatta, meaning a light-shunning insect.

Species
Species include:

 Blatta orientalis Linnaeus, 1758 Oriental cockroach
 Blatta furcata (Karny 1908)

References

External links
 
 

Cockroach genera